The Ville de Nantes class consisted of three second-rank, 90-gun, steam-powered ships of the line built for the French Navy in the 1850s. Most of the ships participated in the Second French intervention in Mexico in the 1860s and spent extensive amounts of time in reserve. In 1871–1872 the sister ships were used as prison ships after the Paris Commune was crushed by the French government in 1871.

Description
The Ville de Nantes-class ships were repeats of the preceding ship of the line  and were also designed by naval architect Henri Dupuy de Lôme. Their crew numbered 913 officers and ratings.

The Ville de Nantes class were powered by a pair of four-cylinder steam engines that drove the single propeller shaft using steam provided by eight boilers.

Each of the Ville de Nantes-class ships was armed with a unique mixture of 30-pounder smoothbore cannon,  rifled muzzle-loading (RML) guns as well as 164.7 mm and  Paixhans guns. The guns were distributed between the upper and lower gundecks and the quarterdeck and forecastle.

Ships

See also 
List of ships of the line of France

Citations

Bibliography

 
90-gun ship of the line classes
Ship of the line classes from France
 
Napoléon-class ships of the line
Ship classes of the French Navy